Alpha Herculis (α Herculis, abbreviated Alpha Her, α Her), also designated 64 Herculis, is a multiple star system in the constellation of Hercules. Appearing as a single point of light to the naked eye, it is resolvable into a number of components through a telescope. It has a combined apparent magnitude of 3.08, although the brightest component is variable in brightness. Based on parallax measurements obtained during the Hipparcos mission, it is approximately 360 light-years (110 parsecs) distant from the Sun.

System 

Alpha Herculis is a triple star system.  The primary (brightest) of the three stars, designated α1 Herculis or α Herculis A, is a pulsating variable star on the asymptotic giant branch (AGB), and is the second nearest AGB star after Mira.  The primary star forms a visual binary pair with a second star, which is itself a spectroscopic binary.

Alpha Herculis also forms the A and B components of a wider system  designated WDS J17146+1423, with two additional faint visual companions designated WDS J17146+1423C and D.  The two fainter stars are far more distant than the triple system.

Nomenclature

α Herculis (Latinised to Alpha Herculis) is the system's Bayer designation; α1 and α2 Herculis, those of its two visible components. 64 Herculis is the system's Flamsteed designation. WDS J17146+1423 is the wider system's designation in the Washington Double Star Catalog. The designations of Alpha Herculis' main components as Alpha Herculis A and B and the wider system's four components as WDS J17146+1423A, B, C and D, together with the spectroscopic pair - Alpha Herculis Ba and Bb - derive from the convention used by the Washington Multiplicity Catalog (WMC) for multiple star systems, and adopted by the International Astronomical Union (IAU).

Alpha Herculis bore the traditional name Rasalgethi or Ras Algethi ( 'Head of the Kneeler'). 'Head' comes from the fact that in antiquity Hercules was depicted upside down on maps of the constellation. In 2016, the IAU organized a Working Group on Star Names (WGSN) to catalog and standardize proper names for stars. The WGSN approved the name Rasalgethi for the component Alpha Herculis A (α1) on 30 June 2016 and it is now so included in the List of IAU-approved Star Names.

The term ra's al-jaθiyy or Ras al Djathi appeared in the catalogue of stars in the Calendarium of Al Achsasi al Mouakket, which was translated into Latin as Caput Ingeniculi.

In Chinese astronomy, Alpha Herculis is called 帝座, Pinyin: Dìzuò, meaning 'Emperor's Seat'. The star is seen as marking itself, and stands alone in the center of the Emperor's Seat asterism, Heavenly Market enclosure (see: Chinese constellations). 帝座 (Dìzuò) was westernized into Ti Tso by R.H. Allen, with the same meaning

Properties 

Alpha Herculis A and B are more than 500 AU apart, with an estimated orbital period of approximately 3600 years. A presents as a relatively massive red bright giant, but radial velocity measurements suggest a companion with a period of the order of a decade. B's two components are a primary yellow giant star and a secondary, yellow-white dwarf star in a 51.578 day orbit.

Alpha Herculis A is an asymptotic giant branch (AGB) star, a luminous red giant that has both hydrogen and helium shells around a degenerate carbon-oxygen core. It is the second nearest AGB star to the Sun. The angular diameter of the star has been measured with an interferometer as
34 ± 0.8 mas, or 0.034 arcseconds. If Alpha Herculis were at the center of the Solar System its radius would extend past the orbit of Mars at 1.5 AU but not quite as far as the asteroid belt.

Alpha Herculis A has been specified as a standard star for the spectral class M5 Ib-II.  Like most type M stars near the end of their lives, Alpha Herculis is experiencing a high degree of stellar mass loss creating a sparse, gaseous envelope that extends at least 930 AU.  It is a semiregular variable with complex changes in brightness with periods ranging from a few weeks to many years.  The most noticeable variations occur at timescales of 80–140 days and at 1,000 - 3,000 days.  The strongest detectable period is 128 days.  The full range in brightness is from magnitude 2.7 to 4.0, but it usually varies over a much smaller range of around 0.6 magnitudes.

Notes

References

External links
An Atlas of the Universe: Multiple Star Orbits
Upside down Hercules showing Alpha Herculisethi as the head: Hercules

Double stars
Hercules (constellation)
Herculis, Alpha
Herculis, 064
Triple star systems
Rasalgethi
M-type bright giants
G-type giants
F-type main-sequence stars
6406 7
084345
156014 5
BD+14 3207
Semiregular variable stars
M-type supergiants
Asymptotic-giant-branch stars